Dane Cameron (born October 18, 1988) is an American racing driver from Glen Ellen, California. He won the IMSA WeatherTech SportsCar Championship overall in 2016 and 2019, and also in the GTD class in 2014.

Early career
After karting, Cameron began his auto racing career in 2005 in the Jim Russell Racing School and Formula Russell where he won the championship. In 2006 he competed in the U.S. F2000 National Championship and finished runner-up to J. R. Hildebrand. That fall Cameron won a Team USA Scholarship to participate in the Formula Palmer Audi Autumn Trophy in Europe, which he won.

In 2007 Cameron competed in the Star Mazda Championship and won the title over James Davison on the back of three race wins and only one finish outside the top-ten. With his championship he won a scholarship to race in the Atlantic Championship in 2008. Cameron finished seventh in points with a best performance of finishing second from the pole in the first race at Road America.

Sportscar career 
Cameron turned to sports car racing in 2009 where he drove a Mazda RX-8 in the Rolex Sports Car Series for Racers Edge Motorsports. He finished 17th in GT class drivers' points with a best finish of third at Watkins Glen International. Cameron had ten different co-drivers in the Racers Edge #30 car throughout the season. In 2010 Cameron made only two Rolex Sports Car Series starts but both were in the top-flight Daytona Prototype class. He drove in the 24 Hours of Daytona for Beyer Racing and the New Jersey Motorsports Park race for Starworks Motorsport. He also made one American Le Mans Series start (the 12 Hours of Sebring) in the LMPC class with Genoa Racing and his team won their class.

In 2011 he competed with Dempsey Racing/Team Seattle in their Rolex GT class Mazda RX-8 with teammate James Gué. They finished fourth in the championship with three third-place finishes and six top 5s. In 2012 he drove Team Sahlen's RX-8 in the same series with Wayne Nonnamaker. He ranked 6th in points with a class win at Mazda Raceway Laguna Seca and three podiums.

Cameron moved up to the Rolex Daytona Prototype class full-time with Team Sahlen in 2013, again sharing ride with Wayne Nonnamaker. With two fourth-place finishes, he finished tenth in the drivers standings. Also, he partnered with eventual LMPC drivers champion Mike Guasch in four rounds of the American Le Mans Series.

In the 2014 United SportsCar Championship, Cameron moved to the GTD class to drive a Turner BMW Z4 with Markus Palttala. He claimed four class wins and two third-place finishes in 11 rounds, winning the GTD drivers championship.

The driver moved to the Prototype class for the 2015 IMSA season, sharing an Action Express Racing Corvette with Eric Curran. He claimed two wins, four podiums and top 5 finishes in every race. As a result, he ended third in the drivers standings. Cameron was renewed with the team for 2016 and 2017.

For the 2018 IMSA season, Cameron picked up Juan Pablo Montoya as a co-driver at Team Penske. In the second year of the partnership, Cameron, Montoya and Penske claimed the Dpi championship. He also earned the highest number of Pro-Am points in the SRO Americas Challenge, but was excluded from the championship due to an injury-forced co-driver change.

In 2020, Cameron joined Honda Racing Team JAS for Intercontinental Challenge GT events.

Hypercar career
Cameron became a member of the Porsche Penske Motorsport outfit in 2023, where he would drive a Porsche 963 alongside Michael Christensen and Frédéric Makowiecki in the World Endurance Championship.

Personal life
Cameron's father was a racing engineer. Dane is married with two children.

Complete motorsports results

American Open-Wheel racing results
(key) (Races in bold indicate pole position, races in italics indicate fastest race lap)

U.S. F2000 National Championship

Star Mazda Championship
{| class="wikitable" style="text-align:center; font-size:90%"
! Year
! Team
! 1
! 2
! 3
! 4
! 5
! 6
! 7
! 8
! 9
! 10
! 11
! 12
! Rank
! Points
|-
| 2007
! JDC MotorSports
|style="background:#DFFFDF;"| SEB4
|style="background:#FFFFBF;"|  HOU1
|style="background:#FFFFBF;"| VIR1
|style="background:#DFFFDF;"| MMP4
|style="background:#CFCFFF;"| POR17
|style="background:#DFDFDF;"| CLE2
|style="background:#FFFFBF;"| TOR1
|style="background:#DFDFDF;"| RAM2
|style="background:#DFDFDF;"| TRO2
|style="background:#FFDF9F;"| MOS3
|style="background:#CFEAFF;"| RAT8
|style="background:#DFDFDF;"| LAG2
|style="background:#FFFFBF;"| 1st|style="background:#FFFFBF;"| 450|}

Atlantic Championship

Complete IMSA SportsCar Championship results

Complete FIA World Endurance Championship results
(key) (Races in bold indicate pole position; races in italics'' indicate fastest lap)

* Season still in progress.

24 Hours of Le Mans results

References

External links

Living people
1988 births
Sportspeople from Newport Beach, California
Racing drivers from California
24 Hours of Daytona drivers
American Le Mans Series drivers
Rolex Sports Car Series drivers
Indy Pro 2000 Championship drivers
Atlantic Championship drivers
WeatherTech SportsCar Championship drivers
U.S. F2000 National Championship drivers
Team Penske drivers
GT World Challenge America drivers
24 Hours of Le Mans drivers
Porsche Motorsports drivers
JDC Motorsports drivers
Meyer Shank Racing drivers
Action Express Racing drivers
Starworks Motorsport drivers
FIA World Endurance Championship drivers